Pump It Up is a music video game series developed and published by Andamiro, a Korean arcade game producer. The game is similar to Dance Dance Revolution, except that it has five arrow panels as opposed to four, and is typically played on a dance pad with five arrow panels: the top-left, top-right, bottom-left, bottom-right, and a center. Additional gameplay modes may utilize two five-panel pads side by side. These panels are pressed using the player's feet, in response to arrows that appear on the screen in front of the player. The arrows are synchronized to the general rhythm or beat of a chosen song, and success is dependent on the player's ability to time and position their steps accordingly.

The original version of the game was originally released in South Korea on September 20, 1999. The game has also been released in other markets, such as North America, South America, and Europe. Pump It Up 2019 XX: 20th Anniversary Version is the latest version of the series, released on January 7, 2019, in Latin American countries. Pump It Up has tried to cater more to freestyle players than "technical" players with more freestyle-friendly charts, and as a result, the game has more of a culture in the freestyle and breakdancing disciplines. However, the game still caters well to technical players with a vast array of high-difficulty songs and stepcharts.

Installments 

A standard Pump it Up arcade machine consists of two parts, the cabinet and the dance platform. The cabinet has a wide bottom section, which houses large floor speakers and glowing neon lamps. Above this sits a narrower section that contains the monitor, and on top is a lighted marquee graphic, with two small speakers and flashing lights on it. The dance stage is a raised metal platform divided into two sides. Each side houses a set of five acrylic glass pads arranged like the pips on the 5 side of a die, separated by metal squares. Each pad sits atop pressure activated switches, and a software-controlled cold cathode lamp illuminating the translucent pad. A metal safety bar in the shape of an "R" is mounted to the dance stage behind each player. Some players make use of this safety bar to help maintain proper balance, do tricks during Freestyle routines, and to relieve weight from the legs so that arrows can be pressed with greater speed and accuracy. Some community members place more emphasis on no-bar play as many major Pump it Up tournaments used to not allow bar usage or had a separate division allowing it. However, song difficulty has risen over the years making some songs impossible to play without using the bar.

DX cabinets utilize a large rear-projection television as their monitor (with the lights being on the sides of the screen's enclosure instead of along the top), and FX cabinets contain a plasma display as the monitor, LED lights, and a pair of LED vertical VU meters on the sides. As of NX2, all Pump it Up machines now include USB ports on the side of the cabinet which allow the saving of statistics and unlocks to a proprietary USB drive. All FX cabinets contain them (as NX was slated to have USB functionality, which was later shifted to NX2), and the upgrade kit for NX2 includes the external USB ports so that they can be soldered to the machine if it doesn't already have them. As of the release of Pump It Up PRIME 2, arcade machines now have the option to use the AM.PASS card system instead of a USB flash drive.

Home versions 
Andamiro released home versions of Pump it Up for personal computers, coming with a CD containing the game and a special dance mat, with arrows of the same size as the arcade's pads. On Korean versions, the mat is connected through the PS/2 port, and comes with an adapter to share it with the keyboard. On international versions, the mat uses a USB plug. Pump it Up THE FUSION: The 1st N' 2nd Dance Floor, Pump it Up THE FUSION: The 3rd Dance Floor, Pump it Up Perfect Collection, and Pump it Up: The Prex 3 were all released on PCs. Andamiro also released a home version of Pump it Up for PCs in 2001, which was released exclusively in North America. Titled Pump it Up: The Evolutionary Dance Floor, it includes a Pump it Up dance mat, a Pump it Up: The Evolutionary Dance Floor PC game, a Pump it Up: The Prex 3 PC game, and a music CD titled Pump it Up: The Banya's Original Collection.

On 11 November 2004, Andamiro released the Korean version of Pump It Up: Exceed on the PlayStation 2, which includes most of the songs from the arcade Exceed version. An American version of the game was released on 31 August 2005 for the Xbox and PlayStation 2 by Mastiff under the title Pump It Up Exceed SE. This version includes most of the songs from the Korean PS2 version and six US-licensed songs, as well as revivals and removals from Exceed 2. Exceed SE also uses the updated engine from Exceed 2. While the Korean version of the game is rated All by the Korea Media Rating Board, the North American version is rated T for Teen by the ESRB.

On 30 November 2006, Pump it Up: Exceed was released for the PSP as Pump it Up Exceed Portable exclusively in Korea. This version of the game is rated All by the Korea Media Rating Board. A PSP version of Pump it Up Zero was also released on 15 October 2007. This version of the game is rated All by the Game Rating and Administration Committee. Unlike Exceed, there is no console release of Zero.

Andamiro on 27 March 2018, released a teaser screenshot for the mobile-phone version of the game, Pump It Up M. Beta testing for the game is now over (30 March 2018).

Pump it Up can be simulated by the programs Kick It Up, Direct Move, StepMania.

Gameplay 
Typically a game of Pump It Up starts by displaying a screen asking if the player is playing alone giving time for a second player to join in. This waiting time may be sped up by tapping the center gold arrow (used as a submit button). Players may insert a USB flash drive containing an access code or tap an A.M. pass card which you can on the game center's counter where the P.I.U. cabinet is installed.

If there are no USB flash drives or A.M. pass card logged in, the game will default to Basic/Easy mode on more recent games. Games started with a PumBi drive inserted will default to Arcade mode. Players may input the "All songs" code to access this mode without a PumBi drive by tapping down left, up left, center, up right, down right, quickly with their feet. Games prior to Pump it up Zero show the player a "Station Select" screen to allow the player to select their difficulty. Station select can be accessed in all games by tapping the upper right or left arrows and allows for alternate game modes on later games.

Once a player has selected their game mode they are presented a list of songs. To switch between songs the player steps on the rear right and left arrows on the pad. Various statistics such as the song speed in BPM, song artist and song difficulty will be displayed. Waiting with the cursor on the song will play a sample of the song and may display an example background video from that song. To select a song the players must press the central yellow arrow. Games after Pump It Up Zero allow the player to select difficulty at this time. To select difficulty they may tap the rear arrows. To go back to the main menu the player taps the upper corner arrows. To begin the song the player taps the yellow arrow a second time.

The core gameplay involves the player moving his or her feet to a set pattern, stepping in time to the general rhythm or beat of a song. During normal gameplay arrows scroll upwards from the bottom of the screen and pass over stationary arrows near the top (referred to as the "guide arrows" or "receptors"). When the scrolling arrows overlap the stationary ones, the player must step on the corresponding arrows on the dance platform. Players receive a judgment for each step based on the accuracy of the step. Judgments include, from best to worst, Superb, Perfect, Great, Good, Bad, and Miss. The timing window of these judgments varies from version to version and can depend on the difficulty of the machine set by the machine operator.

Regular arrows come on the full beat, half beat, quarter beat or sixteenth beat depending on the song's steps. Longer arrows referred to as "holds" must be held down for their entire length with them adding additional Perfects to the combo. In addition holds can be held on to before the hold passes through without penalty.

Successfully hitting the arrows in time with the music fills a life bar, while failure to do so drains it. If the bar is fully depleted during gameplay with Stage Break mode turned on the player fails the song usually resulting in a game over. If Stage Break is off, players only fail the song (and cause play to stop) by getting a combo of 51 consecutive misses. If the player completes the song without draining the life bar or missing too much the player is taken to the Results Screen which rates the player's performance with a letter grade and a numerical score among other statistics.

After completing a song the player may be given a chance to play again depending on the settings of the particular machine. The number of songs in credit is 3 songs + bonus on all versions other than Extra Mix and NX2. Extra allows changing the game to 2+1 while NX2 is 2+1 by default on Arcade Station (3 songs in all other Stations). If the player gets an A ranking or better on all songs in a game, the player earns a "bonus stage". Later games display how many A or S grades a player has gained that game on the select screen via a life bar featuring hearts. Getting any score other than an A ranking or higher will lower the number of hearts. If the player passes a song with a D rank or lower but does not fail then the player's song set will be reduced to just two songs.

Difficulty 
The steps for the various levels of difficulty available for a particular song are ranked using a scale, the format of which varies from version to version. Early games had difficulty ranked by "Station" with all songs on a station having the same difficulty. Stations became ways to select song types in Pump it Up Zero and then became ways to select different game modes after the New Xenesis series. Some stations are meant for more advanced players despite hosting a selection of difficulties inside of them. For example, the Music Train, World Max and Mission stations are often for advanced players while Arcade or the Easy station are for general players.

Before Exceed was released, the difficulty for all game modes ranged from 1 to 10, with the exception of "Vook", a song introduced on The Premiere 2, which was level 12 on Double mode. Level 1 was the easiest song available at that difficulty while level 10 was reserved for the most difficult. With Exceed's debut all levels were reworked into a unified range from 1 to 10 for most modes, up to level 15 for Crazy mode and ranging as high as 20 for Nightmare mode. Successive games have resulted in higher level ranges for all song difficulties as well as an overall higher maximum difficulty cap for Nightmare Mode.

Exceed 2 added the infamous "????" rating for unusually difficult songs. This level is often referred to as "unrated". Many unrated songs are more difficult than the allowed maximum. All "another" rated songs given a level of "??" in Exceed 2. Later games have most "another" step songs show a numeric difficulty instead of question marks. Unrated songs often feature gimmicks, experimental charts, or are not made to be beaten by a single player and are not recommended for the average player. Another rating charts vary in difficulty and can be easy, however, they are typically harder than the regular chart of the song at a similar level.

Early games up to Zero and including the New Xenesis series showed the levels via icons. These games use a star scale to measure the lower levels, which goes up to 8 in half increments (for a maximum level of 16). The higher levels are measure by a skull scale which goes up to 8 in whole increments. On NX2 and NX Absolute, the difficulty scale is modified with a line of circles that go up to 8 in whole increments. Higher difficulties replace these circles with stars and even higher difficulties replace the stars with skulls.

Starting with Fiesta, the Normal / Hard / Crazy / Freestyle / Nightmare modes are replaced by prefixing the difficulty level before the difficulty number. Another difficulty charts are placed among the regular charts for the song and are prefixed with "Another" instead of a difficulty level, though this was removed between Fiesta and Prime.

Modifiers 
Since the first release, all game modes accept modifiers which are enabled by using special codes inputted by rapidly stepping on the gamepad. The effects vary from speeding arrows up, changing the design of the arrows altogether, making them fade as they go up, or making them appear in random places instead of their pre-defined column (while still being on the same beat).

Most players after a starting period get used to applying the modifiers to make arrows faster which makes them more spaced out. All songs have a default speed of 2x. It is also possible to decrease the arrow speed. Using modifiers a matter of personal preferences even though the increased speed options are very popular, especially at higher levels where there are many arrows on the screen at once.

The most popular step codes for the specific version are contained on a sticker affixed to the machine. If a player has a PumBi drive inserted, their preferred modifiers are automatically saved and will be applied to every song until the player changes their modifier settings.

Modes
Games before Pump it Up Zero used the Station select to choose the game's difficulty. Later games use the Station Select screen to choose the game mode.

"Easy Station" or "Basic Mode" is the default mode on all games starting with Pump it Up Fiesta. In this mode, song difficulties are color-coded to help identify harder songs. Blue songs are the easiest, yellow songs are normal, red songs represent hard ones, and purple for very hard ones, while green color is showing difficulty in Double mode. To leave Easy mode the player can enter the "FULL MODE" command, insert a flash drive containing user data or use an AM.PASS card (from PRIME 2). The Pro series also supports mission mode, music train and the regular arcade game once out of easy mode.

"Arcade Station" or  "Full Mode"  is for players familiar with the game. In this mode the player may access hundreds of songs not available in Basic Mode. The screen also changes to show the traditional difficulty modes and colors. If a USB flash drive containing user data is inserted or an AM.PASS card is used to login, high scores are saved for later use and the machine will display local high scores after each song. These scores are uploaded to the Andamiro website to join in the global rankings.

"Special Zone" was introduced in Pump It Up NX. This mode contains original mixes for some songs, remixes of several arcade song, also alternate version of songs and charts (later known as Another difficulty) mashed together. In modern iterations starting from Pump It Up FIESTA, These are now placed into channels system such as: Full Songs, Remix, and the later introduced Shortcut which contained shorter edit of some songs.

"Rank Mode" was introduced in Pump It Up PRIME is an extra hard mode for machines connected to the Internet that requires a USB flash drive with user data (for PRIME and later) or an AM.PASS card (for PRIME 2) to access. This mode allows players to test themselves in stricter conditions, with timing windows stricter than in Full Mode (VJ or Very Hard judgement) inability to use BGA Off (BGA Dark in later iteration) which dims the background animation, and inability to use mod groups such as JUDGE and ALTERNATE. Regardless of the machine settings, if the player's life bar reaches zero, it will result in a game over. Songs in this mode are starting at level 13 and lower ones can't be played in it. All points scored in this mode are recorded on the Andamiro website in the player's personal profile, saving the total score gathered along with separate scores for Single and Double charts.

"Music Train" mode was introduced in Pump It Up Fiesta. Music trains are pre-selected courses where multiple songs play continuously. Many music trains feature a unique theme or gimmick to them, catering to advanced players. Pump It Up PRIME 2 introduced the "Random Train" mode, where tracks are randomly chosen from player-defined difficulty brackets.

"Skill Up Zone", "Mission Zone" or "Quest Zone" is unlocked by inserting a USB drive into the machine. Mission Mode presents new goals for advanced players to meet which can be as simple as a different step pattern to a familiar song or as complex as modifications to the game's interface. When a player attempts or clears a mission, they are granted EXP (experience points) to advance further in the mode. The mode was expanded into the World Tour mode on NX, and the RPG-styled WorldMax on NX2.

"Battle Mode" appeared on "Pump it Up 2nd DF". The player with the higher score would win the battle. On Perfect Collection and The Premiere, a player could "attack" their opponent with modifiers by creating combos, with longer combos resulting in more damaging attacks. On Exceed 2 there are extra bonus arrows containing power-ups activated by action steps that come up later which launches the attack. The battle could be decided in only 1 song in most cases. Stage Break does not affect this mode.

"Division Mode", appearing on Premiere 2 and Rebirth, utilized special stepcharts with "switches" that could switch between a "Groove" style (for freestyling), and a "Wild" style for more advanced charts.

"Half-Double", appearing on Premiere 2 and Rebirth and remaining until Premiere 3 and Prex 3, was a mode that only used the 6 panels in the middle (both centers plus the right arrow pair on the 1p side and the left arrow pair on the 2p side).

"Nonstop Remix Mode" contains longer club mixes of several songs, and sometimes even long versions of existing songs.

"Training Station" was introduced in Pump It Up NX, and consists of special tutorials themed on various fundamentals of play. Lessons consist of 3 songs with special stepcharts emphasizing the theme of the lesson.

"Brain Shower" was introduced in Pump It Up NXA. It is a new type of game that combines the traditional timing of steps and arrows with mental exercises including mathematics, observation, and memory.

Channels 
Games starting from Pump It Up 2010 FIESTA: 10th Anniversary Version  uses Channels to categorize every single songs within the game. Certain Channels will have sub-categories within itself.

Categories by songs 
"Original Tunes" channel contains arcade edits produced by Andamiro's in-house music producers, such as: BanYa Production, Yahpp, DOIN, MAX, etc.

"World Music" channel contains arcade edits from licensed music.

"J-Music" channel contains arcade edits from licensed Japanese music.

"K-Pop"channel contains arcade edits from licensed Korean Pop music.

"XROSS" channel contains arcade edits from rhythm game collaboration such as: O2Jam, EZ2AC, and NeonFM.

"Remix" channel features longer songs that have been remixed or mashed up tracks. (With the exception of Repeatorment Remix, which is an original track.)

"Full Songs" channel features Original Mixes of some songs within the game, albeit some songs such as Baroque Virus from Pump It Up Infinity, "Bad Apple!!", No Despair, Dignity, Butterfly (SID-Sound), I'll Give You All My Love, Slam, etc. uses a different edit than the Album Version. They're either shortened a bit, or got a full audio remastering for the game such as tempo fix and audio mixing, etc.

"Shortcut" channel features shorter edits of some songs within the game.

Categories by stepcharts 
Difficulty Zone Single channel contains 5-panel stepcharts that can be played by one player, sorted by difficulty with Level 1 or S1 as the lowest range. (Including Single Performance for Freestyle players)

Difficulty Zone Double channel contains 10-panel stepcharts that can be played by one player, sorted by difficulty with Level 1 or D1 as the lowest range. (Including Double Performance for Freestyle players)

CO-OP Play channel contains 10-panel stepcharts that can be played by two players or more. (example: CO-OP x5 means that the stepchart can be played up to by five players)

User Custom Step channel contains user-submitted stepcharts downloaded from Andamiro's PIU UCS website, the content of this channel will depend on AM.Pass account. If there are no UCS downloaded within the user data, this channel will not appeared in-game.

Online Matching 
This mode was introduced in Pump It Up 2019 XX: 20th Anniversary Version, it let players to compare their gameplay performance with other players around the world in real time. During gameplay, the opponent's combo will be shown as a small yellow combo counts below the player's combo count. Then later the result will be shown side by side.

Development 

Pump It Up 1st Dance Floor (also Pump It Up: The Ultimate Remix) is a dance simulation arcade game developed by Korean coin-operated machine developer Andamiro. It is the first of the Pump It Up series. It was released in September 1999, nearly a year after the release of Dance Dance Revolution. The first game in the series was followed by 2nd Dance Floor, 3rd: O.B.G (Oldies but Goodies), 3rd: SE (Season Evolution), The Perfect Collection, Extra, and Rebirth.

The first internationally released version was titled Pump it Up: The Premiere, an adaptation of the Perfect Collection version containing 6 covers of American songs. The next version was called The Prex (combining Premiere with the Korean Extra version), and The Premiere 2, based on Rebirth. Another Prex title was released, Prex 2, followed by Premiere 3 and Prex 3. The International and Korean releases would be unified on the 9th version, Prex 3, which was released in Korea and in the rest of the world. The series began catering to both Korea and the rest of the world starting with Exceed

Konami filed a lawsuit in Seoul, Korea against Andamiro in 2000, claiming that Pump it Up infringed upon their design right for Dance Dance Revolution. The court found in Konami's favor, but Andamiro appealed. At the same time, Andamiro sued Konami in the state of California, claiming that DDR violated their patent for Pump it Up. Both suits were ultimately settled out of court, and the details were never publicly released.

Improvements across versions 
The first series title was Pump It Up 1st Dance Floor, released by Korean coin-operated machine developer Andamiro in October 1999 for the arcade. This game introduced the series' first in-house musician BanYa, the South Korean band working with Andamiro to compose original songs as well as a selection of popular K-pop and dance songs. All versions between this one and Pump It Up Zero simply added new songs and new steps. If a game is not noted in this section, then that game simply introduced new songs with few noteworthy changes.

Although it was developed by a different developer and only has four arrow panels, In the Groove 2 was originally marketed as a Pump it Up game.

Pump It Up Zero was released in the arcade in January 2006 before releasing on the PSP in October of the following year. Zero contained a brand new interface, now featuring previews of background videos and the ability for two players to play on separate difficulties. Zero also contained the Easy Station, a mode containing a modified interface and a selection of easy songs. The Mission Station contained sets of songs played with specific conditions that must be met when they are played – such as getting a specific amount of a judgment for instance.

Zero also introduced the "Another" step chart difficulty. Another Step songs are not entirely new songs. Rather, they are songs with steps which differ from their original counterparts drastically with some being very experimental in nature. Another Step songs are not given a specific category and are listed with the regular charts for each song. Generally the difficulty of Another charts range from easy to extremely hard, with some songs being impossible to complete without a second player. This has remained a standard feature in later games.

Pump It Up New Xenesis, or NX, was released in December 2006 with new tracks and a mode with nonstop remixes. The channel arrangement on NX was altered, now featuring a default channel containing all 29 new Arcade Station songs. NX is World Tour was a new series of missions for Mission mode named after capital cities of various nations throughout the world as well as after the developers of NX at Nexcade. It consists of a group of 64 missions of three songs each, all with unique step charts containing various challenges such as passing a song, or completing a song with specific conditions or goals to accomplish.

The Remix Station from Zero had been changed to the Special Zone: an area containing nonstop remixes, long versions of songs, and Another mode songs. All of Pump it Up Zeros Another songs have also been moved to the Special Zone. Most of the unlocks, however, depend on playing through World Tour mode. In addition, a new cabinet style has been added to the lineup featuring a futuristic design and a 42' plasma display. Yahpp, who split from the BanYa team, became the project lead leading to a style similar to the early games.

Unlike in earlier games, the difficulty level of a song in NX is not visually represented by a number. Levels 1 through 14 are shown as star icons, each level corresponding to a half icon, while levels 15 to 22 are shown as skull icons, with each level corresponding to a whole icon. Pump It Up NX2 displays both the stars/skulls and a digital level indicator. The Extra and the Prex series of games also use this graphical style. A "????????" rating is given to songs that are "beyond the charts", gimmick charts that are meant to be impossible for one player, or charts that are meant for two players at the same time. The "????????" rating was kept for extreme songs in later games outside of this series.

NX2 released in December 2007, added support for Andamiro's proprietary USB flash drives, which save player progress and worldwide ranking. A new metagame life system was introduced that allows players to play four songs instead of three if they have life left at the end of three songs. Getting an A ranking or higher allows the player to maintain their life points, however, anything lower than an A will cost the player life points. If a player does especially poorly their set will be reduced to only two songs.

The Pump It Up 2010 Fiesta:10th Anniversary Version added two new mission modes (Quest and Skill Up) and removed difficulty levels in favor of chart options. The sequels Fiesta 2 (2012) and PRIME (2014) feature a wide selection of music with Prime introducing the global Rank Mode. The next game in the series, PRIME 2(2016), introduced a new speed system named Auto Velocity, which is calculated by dividing the players Auto Velocity with the BPM of the selected song. In XX(2019), A number of new features have appeared, such as Online Matching, a new title feature, step rewards and more. It is also the first game to only support HD, therefore, only supporting MK9 and MK10 systems.

The Pro/Infinity series
Pump It Up Pro was released by Fun in Motion and Andamiro in 2007. The product is a spin-off of Pump It Up, and was developed separately from the main series with the intent of getting players who normally play 4-panel dance games to try 5-panel dancing. The game utilizes a heavily modified build of StepMania 4 for its engine and was purchasable as a cabinet or as an upgrade for existing Pump It Up machines running MK6 or MK7 hardware.

Kyle Ward is the project lead and is responsible for many of the songs and step charts in this series. Many elements of the game are inherited from In the Groove, a four-panel dance game which Kyle Ward was previously involved with, such as the ability to save stats and song edits on a USB flash drive. Andamiro built cabinets for and distributed In the Groove 2.

The Pro series is also unique among Pump it Up games due to its trademark style. These are the first games led by a non-Korean project head. The good will fostered by Kyle Ward working with Andamiro to create cabinets for In the Groove 2 led to him being given a position within the company as a project creator, lead, and creative consultant.

The default mode is Easy mode, which offers a simplified user interface where a minimal number of options are selectable and the most difficult songs have been removed. The Revision 5 patch added Half Double mode as a difficulty which uses the 6 panels on the inside of the pad layout excluding the outer corners from play. Pump It Up Pro does not contain a separate mode for remixes and long versions, the long songs and remixes present on Pro are present in regular play, and require two rounds to play. In place of a Remix mode is Progressive, a mode containing courses consisting of four songs each. A sequel was released in 2010.

Pump It Up Infinity (2013) was intended as a reboot of the original Pro idea and introduces a "Basic mode" to encourage new players. Infinity features songs from all Pump It Up versions, including the spin-off series Pump It Up Pro and Pump It Up Pro 2.

Mobile version 
From the official teaser screenshot, the mobile version or known as Pump It Up M introduces some new features that is only exclusive for this version such as training mode, scout, and in-game shop menu. The leaked screenshot also reveals some Prime songs on the game that maybe refer to the default songlist of the game.

Music 

The songs used in Pump It Up are mostly Korean-based. Premiere 3 and Exceed were the only versions to put a greater emphasis on international pop music due to its branching into other markets such as North and Latin America. After Exceed, the focus shifted back to K-pop as the players worldwide generally favored the game's original Korean music. Much of the music on Pump is contributed by an in-house (and mostly anonymous) collective known as BanYa. Two of the main members, Yahpp and Msgoon, recently became independent artists (and as of NX and Fiesta respectively, all of their songs are now branded using their aliases). Aside from the K-pop licenses, most in-house songs on Pump it Up are of Korean influence. The diversity in genres is very great despite this, covering everything from general pop to heavy metal to Hip hop as well as an assortment of uncommon genres such as jazz, folk, and ska. Some of BanYa's songs include covers of classical pieces such as Canon in D, mostly performed in a symphonic rock style.

In comparison to Konami's Bemani line-up and other arcade rhythm games, there has been a negligible emphasis on electronic music in Pump, but the first instances of electronic music on Pump were on NX2, as five crossovers from the American-made spinoff appeared, which in contrast, has a greater emphasis on electronic music.

List of Pump it Up games  

 Pump It Up: The 1st Dance Floor (20 September 1999, Arcade, exclusive to Korea)
 Pump It Up: The 2nd Dance Floor (27 December 1999, Arcade, exclusive to Korea)
 Pump It Up THE FUSION: The 1st N' 2nd Dance Floor (1999, PC, exclusive to Korea)
 Pump It Up The O.B.G: The 3rd Dance Floor (7 May 2000, Arcade, exclusive to Korea)
 Pump It Up THE FUSION: The 3rd Dance Floor (2000, PC, exclusive to Korea)
 Pump It Up The O.B.G: The Season Evolution Dance Floor (3 September 2000, Arcade, exclusive to Korea)
 Pump It Up: The Collection (14 November 2000, Arcade, exclusive to Korea)
 Pump It Up: The Perfect Collection (7 December 2000, Arcade/PC, exclusive to Korea)
 Pump It Up Extra (20 January 2001, Arcade, exclusive to Korea)
 Pump It Up The Premiere: The International Dance Floor (June 2001, Arcade)
 Pump It Up: The Evolutionary Dance Floor (2001, PC, exclusive to North America)
 Pump It Up The PREX: The International Dance Floor (November 2001, Arcade)
 Pump It Up The Rebirth: The 8th Dance Floor (10 January 2002, Arcade, exclusive to Korea)
 Pump It Up The Premiere 2: The International 2nd Dance Floor (9 March 2002, Arcade)
 Pump It Up The PREX 2 (November 2002, Arcade)
 Pump It Up The Premiere 3: The International 3rd Dance Floor (May 2003, Arcade)
 Pump It Up The PREX 3: The International 4th Dance Floor (4 October 2003, Arcade/PC, exclusive to Korea)
 Pump It Up Exceed: The International 5th Dance Floor (2 April 2004, Arcade/PS2/Xbox, exclusive to North America/PSP, exclusive to Korea)
 Pump It Up Exceed 2: The International 6th Dance Floor (30 November 2004, Arcade)
 Pump It Up Zero: International 7th Dance Floor (28 January 2006, Arcade/PSP, exclusive to Korea)
 Pump It Up NX: New Xenesis (15 December 2006, Arcade)
 Pump It Up Pro (August 2007, Arcade)
 Pump It Up NX2: Next Xenesis (14 December 2007, Arcade)
 Pump It Up NX Absolute: International 10th Dance Floor (25 November 2008, Arcade)
 Pump It Up Pro 2 (February 2010, Arcade)
 Pump It Up 2010 Fiesta (6 March 2010, Arcade)
 Pump It Up Jump! (2010, Arcade)
 Pump It Up 2011 Fiesta EX (22 January 2011, Arcade)
 Pump It Up 2013 Fiesta 2 (24 November 2012, Arcade)
 Pump It Up Infinity (January 2013, Arcade)
 Pump It Up 2015 Prime (December 2014, Arcade)
 Pump It Up 2017 Prime 2 (November 2016, Arcade)
 Pump It Up H5: 20th Anniversary HTML5 Edition (6 December 2018, Facebook Instant Games)
 Pump It Up XX 20th Anniversary Edition (7 January 2019, Arcade)
 Pump It Up M 20th Anniversary Mobile Edition (17 October 2019, Mobile)
 Upcoming Pump It Up Game (TBA, Arcade)

See also 
 Comparison of dance pad video games
 List of Pump It Up songs
 World Pump Festival

References

External links 

 Andamiro Entertainment Website – makers of PIU (in Korean and English)
 PIU official website

Arcade video games
Dance video games
Music video games
Video games developed in South Korea
Video game franchises introduced in 1999